Two ships of the Royal Navy have borne the name HMS Honeysuckle, after the flower:

  was an  sloop launched in 1915 and sold in 1922 for scrapping.
  was a  launched in 1940 and scrapped in 1950.

Royal Navy ship names